Roger Lewis Finnie (November 6, 1945 – August 6, 2012) was an American football former offensive tackle and defensive tackle who played eleven professional seasons in the National Football League. Finnie played college football for Florida A&M University.

Finnie was an All-City team member at Miami Northwestern Senior High School and a key factor in Northwestern's state championship in 1964. At Florida A&M, Finnie garnered All-Southern Intercollegiate Athletic Conference and All-American honors.

Finnie was selected by the New York Jets in the 14th round of the 1969 NFL Draft. He began his NFL career as a defensive tackle and also played offensive guard and tight end with the Jets. He was traded to the St. Louis Cardinals in 1973 where he was converted to a full-time offensive tackle. Finnie played left tackle on a record-breaking offensive line that included Pro Football Hall of Fame member Dan Dierdorf, Conrad Dobler, Tom Banks, and Bob Young. That unit led the NFL with the fewest sacks allowed for three years (and the National Football Conference for five years) in the mid-1970s. In 1975, the group set an NFL record, allowing only eight sacks in 14 games. The Cardinals traded Finnie to the New Orleans Saints in 1979 where he was reunited with former teammate Dobler. He retired in 1980.

After retirement, Finnie resided in Miami and served as a Coordinator for the Summer Youth Employment and Training Program, also working as a Senior and Youth Counselor. He also coordinated the city football league for boys ages 15 and under and was commissioner of the Miami city basketball team. He was inducted into the FAMU Hall of Fame in 1990.

Finnie died in 2012 at the age of 66.

References

1945 births
2012 deaths
Players of American football from Miami
American football offensive tackles
American football defensive tackles
Florida A&M Rattlers football players
New York Jets players
St. Louis Cardinals (football) players
New Orleans Saints players